The ninth season of Nouvelle Star began on December 11, 2012 and finished on February 26, 2013. Virginie Guilhaume was replaced by Cyril Hanouna. André Manoukian remained as the only original jury member after nine years. Sinclair, Maurane and Olivier Bas joined Manoukian as  judges for the season.

Auditions were held in Marseilles, Lyon and Paris. After the auditions were over the top 100 were cut down in the Trianon Theater to ten without resorting to semi-finals.

Contestants
Top 10 Finalists

 Sophie-Tith Charvet (16) - Winner
 Florian Bertonnier (19)  - Runner-up
 Philippe Krier (24)
 Florian Devos aka. Flo" (20) 
 Julie Obré (25)
 Paul Kay (18)
 Timothée Rossignol (25)
 Charlotte Morgane Berry (24)
 Adélaïde Pratoussy (20)
 Léa Layne (18)

No semifinalist for this season, all were directly selected before the first prime.

Eliminations - Top 10

Elimination chart

References

External links 
 Official site

Season 09
2012 French television seasons
2013 French television seasons